Hair High is a 2004 American adult animated horror romantic comedy film by American filmmaker Bill Plympton. The film is a spoof of late-50s and early-60s high school movies.

Plot
A gothic high-school comedy with a Carrie-like story. A bickering teen couple, Wally (Michael Showalter) and Buttercup (Hayley DuMond) visit Jojo (Keith Carradine)’s Diner for a drink. Having relationship issues with each other, Jojo decides to tell a story about a couple like them. The story he quotes is “a tale of the prom, of love, of Cherri and Spud.” Cherri (Sarah Silverman) and Rod (Dermot Mulroney) are the Echo Lake high school king and queen and they justifiably rule their domain. Cherri’s friend, Darlene (Beverly D'Angelo) is also in love with Rod while his friend Zip (Zak Orth) is in love with her. Spud (Eric Gilliland), the new kid in town, accidentally offends both Cherri and Rod when he scuffs Rod’s car and he writes an insulting note to Cherri and so is forced to become her slave. Naturally and immediately, they hate each other, such as making him do her bidding and humiliating him after a football game, but later on, they fall in love. Cherri and Spud secretly decide to go to the prom together, and on prom night, a rejected Rod forces their car off the road and into the lake. In true 50's ballad style, their car sinks to the bottom of the lake as they share one last kiss. Wally thinks the story is over, but Buttercup thinks otherwise, with Jojo agreeing with her. Going back to the story, Rod lied to teacher Miss Crumbles (Martha Plimpton) that Spud stole Cherri and moved to Mexico with her, having Darlene crowned prom queen and him as the remaining prom king. While the bodies of Cherri and Spud lie in a timeless embrace, Rod is successful in thwarting any investigation and is able to get away with murder. On the night of the following year's prom, the car magically comes to life and slowly drives out of the lake with Cherri and Spud, as if nothing had happened, only this time their bodies are in an advanced state of decomposition. Their rusty and water-logged car drives to the prom and just as Rod and Darlene are about to be crowned king and queen of the prom as before, Cherri and Spud enter the ballroom - the spotlight follows them as they cross the dance floor, with all the attendees in shock. As they approach the stage, spiders, bugs, snakes, lizards and fish ooze from their sagging skin and skeletal bodies, eating Rod’s friend Dwayne (Justin Long) and the prom attendees, including Darlene, freak as they mount the stairs to the stage. Spud takes the crown and places it on Cherri as the animals attack and devour Rod, allowing them to be prom king and queen. At the diner Buttercup sobs over how tragic but beautiful it was, but Wally tries to find out what the point of the story is. Jojo explains to them that Cherri and Spud created a special romance in their short lives. They laugh and joke about it, until they hear the familiar car sounds of Cherri and Spud driving to the prom. Now believing that the story is true, Wally and Buttercup make up with a kiss. Jojo asks if they believe the story. Wally says that he guesses so, and the movie ends with him asking “Who made up this story?”

Cast

Release
It had its U.S. cinema premiere on 17 April 2004 and was released on DVD on 21 July 2010.

References

External links
 Official site
 
 
 
 

2004 films
2004 animated films
2000s American animated films
2000s comedy horror films
American comedy horror films
American high school films
Films directed by Bill Plympton
American animated feature films
Films set in the 1950s
2004 comedy films
2000s English-language films